

Soulard is a historic neighborhood in St. Louis, Missouri. It is the home of Soulard Farmers Market, the oldest farmers' market west of the Mississippi River. Soulard is one of ten certified local historic districts in the city of St. Louis.

History 
It is named for Antoine Soulard and Julia Cérre Soulard. Antoine Soulard first began to develop the land given to him by his father-in-law, Jean-Gabriel Cerré. Soulard was a surveyor for the Spanish government and a refugee from the French Revolution in the 1790s. It is home to several nineteenth century church buildings, including Trinity Lutheran.

Present 
One of the oldest communities in the city, Soulard is today a largely residential neighborhood whose many businesses include restaurants, bars, and the North American headquarters of Anheuser-Busch, which houses the St. Louis Brewery. The neighborhood is divided roughly by Lynch Street; north of which is mostly row homes and small apartments, and south of which is largely the Anheuser-Busch Brewery and headquarters.  Many of its houses date to the mid- to late-19th century. Soulard also has several historic churches. 

Many of its bars host live music, especially the blues and jazz bands for which the city is known. The barrelhouse blues piano player James Crutchfield lived in the neighborhood from 1984 until his death in 2001 and performed in many of the nightclubs. The district hosts regular pub crawls. 

Various neighborhood groups, including the Soulard Restoration Group and the Soulard Business Association, organize events, keep the neighborhood clean and safe, and publish a newspaper, The Soulard Renaissance.

It is home to Soulard Farmers Market, the oldest farmers' market west of the Mississippi. More than a hundred vendors include farmers, produce vendors, meat shops, spice shops, florist shops, and food. 

Soulard Market is featured in the opening scene of Alan Schroeder's picture book Ragtime Tumpie.

Events
Soulard hosts many events throughout the year, including celebrations of Mardi Gras and Oktoberfest.

Demographics

In 2020, Soulard's population was 75.2% White, 15.8% Black, 0.2% Native American, 1.1% Asian, 0% Pacific Islander, 1.5% from some other race, and 6.0% from two or more races. 4.3% of the population was of Hispanic origin.

Gallery

See also
 Anzeiger des Westens, the former large German-American daily newspaper of St. Louis, and the politically charged riot related to its readership that took place in Soulard
 Lafayette Square, St. Louis, a nearby neighborhood
 LaSalle Park, a former area of the neighborhood divided off by the construction of highways
 Missouri Rhineland, a major winemaking area in the region, both past and present

References

Further reading
 Pavlige, Betty. Soulard's Second Century (Voices of America series). Charleston, S.C. : Arcadia Publishing, 2001. ISBN 9780738508214

External links
Soulard.org Soulard Restoration Group - the neighborhood association of Soulard
Soulard at St. Louis Front Page.com
Mardi Gras Inc., Organizers of St. Louis Mardi Gras
Soulard Farmers Market
Soulard Market Official Site
The Lemp Mansion
iLoveSoulard.com

French-American culture in Missouri
Landmarks of St. Louis
Neighborhoods in St. Louis
French colonial settlements of Upper Louisiana